Governor Stearns may refer to:

Clark Daniel Stearns (1870–1944), 9th Governor of American Samoa
Marcellus Stearns (1839–1891), 11th Governor of Florida
Onslow Stearns (1810–1878), 32nd Governor of New Hampshire